The Fort Worth Cats (originally the Fort Worth Panthers) were a minor league baseball team that mostly played in the Texas League from 1888 through 1964. They were affiliated with the Indianapolis Indians in 1933, the Brooklyn Dodgers from 1946 to 1956, and the Chicago Cubs from 1957 to 1958. The team joined the American Association in 1959 and then merged with the Dallas Rangers in 1959 to become the Dallas-Fort Worth Rangers. The teams separated again in 1964 when the Cats rejoined the Texas League, but they merged again the following year and became the Dallas-Fort Worth Spurs. The 1920, 1921, 1922, 1924, and 1925 Panthers teams were selected as among the top 100 minor league teams of all time.

History
The Fort Worth Panthers, also called the Fort Worth Cats, played mostly in the Texas League from its founding in 1888 until 1959. The club won league championships in 1895 and 1905. During the late 1910s and early 1920s, Major League Baseball teams would play in Fort Worth against the Panthers on their way from spring training to their home parks. Texas fans enjoyed watching such major leaguers as Ty Cobb, Babe Ruth, Lou Gehrig, and Rogers Hornsby play in their home town.

The Panthers had a winning streak from 1919 to 1925 when they won the regular season title seven years straight. In 1919 they failed to win the playoff for the season, but won the pennant and represented the Texas League in the Dixie Series for the next six years. The Dixie Series was a championship series between the league champions of the Southern Association and Texas Leagues, both of which had established themselves as some of the best in baseball. Amon Carter and other fans would arrange special trains to ensure that avid fans had transportation to these games. Five of the first six championships were won by Fort Worth with their only loss coming in 1922 to Mobile.

Doyle Williams, an FBI agent who portrayed Governor John Connally in the Warren Commission's 1964 reenactment of the Kennedy Assassination, briefly played in the Cats organization in the mid-1930s. The club won both the Texas League and the Dixie Series in 1930, 1937, and 1939. Rogers Hornsby was the Cats' manager in 1942, but World War II put an end to much of minor league baseball.

Following the War, the Cats became a minor league franchise of the Brooklyn Dodgers. In 1948, the Dodgers sent Bobby Bragan to manage the team, which won its last Texas League, but lost the Dixie Series to Birmingham. The first African American player to play for the team was Maury Wills in 1955.

When the Dodgers moved to Los Angeles in 1957, it caused them to shuffle their minor league teams. The Fort Worth franchise was traded to the Chicago Cubs. In 1959, Fort Worth left the Texas League to join the American Association, but they merged with the Dallas Rangers the following year. Fort Worth regained a Texas League franchise for 1964 only, after which there was no professional baseball in Fort Worth for 36 years until a new Fort Worth Cats franchise was founded.

Year-by-year record

References

External links
Baseball Reference

1888 establishments in Texas
1964 disestablishments in Texas
Baseball teams established in 1888
Baseball teams disestablished in 1964
Defunct baseball teams in Texas
Defunct Texas League teams
Baseball teams in the Dallas–Fort Worth metroplex
Brooklyn Dodgers minor league affiliates
Chicago Cubs minor league affiliates